Destiny is a 1938 Italian drama film directed by Mario Mattoli and starring Cesare Bettarini.

Cast
 Cesare Bettarini
 Luigi Cimara
 Emma Gramatica as Damigella di Bard
 Armando Migliari

References

External links

1938 films
1930s Italian-language films
1938 drama films
Italian black-and-white films
Films directed by Mario Mattoli
Italian drama films
1930s Italian films